Sandra Cecchini and Laura Garrone won in the final 5–7, 6–2, 6–3 against Henrieta Nagyová and Denisa Szabová.

Seeds 
Champion seeds are indicated in bold text while text in italics indicates the round in which those seeds were eliminated.

 Karin Kschwendt /  Rene Simpson (first round)
 Alexandra Fusai /  Radka Zrubáková (semifinals)
 Radka Bobková /  Petra Langrová (first round)
 Sandra Cecchini /  Laura Garrone (champions)

Draw

External links 
 1995 Warsaw Cup by Heros Doubles draw

1995 Doubles
Warsaw Cup by Heros - Doubles
1995 in Polish tennis